CWR can refer to:

 California Western Railroad
 Consolidated Weaponized Robotics now known as Consolidated Robotics
 Continuous welded rail, a modern way of installing rails for railway tracks.
 BBC Coventry & Warwickshire, a radio station in England.
 Crop wild relative, a wild plant closely related to a domesticated plant
 CWR (formerly Crusade for World Revival), a Christian ministry founded by Selwyn Hughes
 Canadian Wrestling Revolution, a Canadian professional wrestling promotion based in Toronto
 Common Works Registration, International format for work registration of the Confédération Internationale des Sociétés d'Auteurs et Compositeurs (CISAC)
 China Weekly Review
CWR Magazine, an online Christian bimonthly replacing The Plain Truth published by Plain Truth Ministries 
 The Catholic World Report
The Churchill War Rooms in London (SW1)
 Cholsey and Wallingford Railway, a heritage railway in the English county of Oxfordshire
 Communicators for Women Religious